Roman Hogen (born 12 December 1970) is a retired Czech football midfielder.

References

1970 births
Living people
Czech footballers
FK Chmel Blšany players
FK Viktoria Žižkov players
SK Slavia Prague players
1. FC Nürnberg players
Association football midfielders
Czech expatriate footballers
Expatriate footballers in Germany
Czech expatriate sportspeople in Germany
Czech First League players
2. Bundesliga players